Kovanec is a municipality and village in Mladá Boleslav District in the Central Bohemian Region of the Czech Republic. It has about 100 inhabitants.

History
The first written mention of Kovanec is from 1546.

References

Villages in Mladá Boleslav District